The Great Buster: A Celebration is a 2018 American documentary film written and directed by Peter Bogdanovich. The film chronicles the life and career of iconic silent film star and comedian Buster Keaton. The film is narrated by Bogdanovich and features interviews with many industry figures such as Dick Van Dyke, Johnny Knoxville, Paul Dooley, French Stewart, Richard Lewis, Carl Reiner, Bill Hader, Mel Brooks, Cybill Shepherd, Werner Herzog, Nick Kroll, Quentin Tarantino, Leonard Maltin, Ben Mankiewicz, Bill Irwin, and Norman Lloyd. The film marked Bogdanovich's final directorial effort before his death in January 2022.

Reception
The film received critical acclaim. On the review aggregator website Rotten Tomatoes, it has a 94% approval rating, based on 47 reviews. The website's consensus reads, "The Great Buster: A Celebration isn't as breathlessly entertaining as the filmography that inspired it, but as a long-overdue primer, it's close to essential."

References

External links
 
 

2018 films
American documentary films
2018 documentary films
Documentary films about film directors and producers
Documentary films about Hollywood, Los Angeles
Films directed by Peter Bogdanovich
Buster Keaton
2010s English-language films
2010s American films